Talk About the Weather is the first studio album by the British rock band Red Lorry Yellow Lorry. It was released in 1985 in the UK on the Red Rhino independent label. It appeared on the New Musical Express indie rock albums chart for several months and peaked at No. 3, indicating strong sales.  The LP had only eight songs, although several subsequent cassette and CD releases included various bonus tracks.

Track listing
 "Talk About the Weather"  – 4:04
 "Hand on Heart"   – 3:49
 "Feel a Piece"  – 2:42
 "Hollow Eyes"  – 3:38
 "This Today"  – 3:23
 "Sometimes"  – 3:01
 "Strange Dreams"  – 3:13
 "Happy"  – 3:23

All tracks were written by Chris Reed, except for "Hand on Heart" and "This Today", written by Reed and David Wolfenden.

Personnel
Chris Reed - vocals, guitar
David Wolfenden - guitar
Paul Southern - bass guitar
Mick Brown - drums

References

Red Lorry Yellow Lorry albums
1985 debut albums